Blepharomastix turiafalis is a moth in the family Crambidae. It was described by William Schaus in 1924. It is found in Peru.

The wingspan is about 20 mm. The wings are white with buffy-brown markings. The forewing costal margin is buffy brown.

References

Moths described in 1924
Blepharomastix